Jeff Blair (born March 30, 1960) is a Canadian newspaper columnist for The Globe and Mail, a sports columnist for Sportsnet and sports talk radio host on Sportsnet 590 The FAN in Toronto.

In June 2019, Blair took over as a host of the long-running, nationally syndicated evening sports radio show Prime Time Sports (also simulcast on television via Sportsnet 360), with co-hosts Stephen Brunt or Richard Deitsch. In October 2019, with the end of Prime Time Sports, Blair, Brunt and Deitsch moved to a mid-afternoon time slot with the debut of Writers Bloc.

Blair was previously a sports columnist for The Globe and Mail and a baseball beat reporter for The Montreal Gazette. In 2012, he also wrote a book, Full Count: Four Decades of Blue Jays Baseball. He began his career as a 19-year-old in 1979.

In 2010, Blair was named to the roll of honour of the Manitoba Sportswriters and Sportscasters Association. In 2018, Blair was awarded the Jack Graney Award by the Canadian Baseball Hall of Fame as "a member of the media who has made significant contributions to baseball in Canada through their life’s work."

Personal life
Blair was born in Kingston, Ontario, but raised in Morden, Manitoba. He went to school at the University of Manitoba. As of 2012, Blair resides in Hamilton, Ontario with his wife Shelley and daughter Emma Rose.

References

External links
Jeff Blair's Sportsnet Column page
Prime Time Sports page

Baseball writers
Canadian bloggers
Canadian sports talk radio hosts
Canadian television sportscasters
Living people
The Globe and Mail columnists
University of Manitoba alumni
Writers from Kingston, Ontario
People from Morden, Manitoba
Writers from Manitoba
1960 births